The Bulls–Cavaliers rivalry is a National Basketball Association (NBA) rivalry between the Cleveland Cavaliers and the Chicago Bulls.  The teams have played each other since the Cavaliers joined the NBA as an expansion team in 1970, but the rivalry didn't begin in earnest until the Bulls drafted Michael Jordan with the third overall pick in 1984. After Jordan would go on to the Washington Wizards and eventually retire, the rivalry died down, but when Cleveland picked LeBron James with the first selection in 2003, the rivalry heated up again.

The Michael Jordan era
Chicago had the third selection in the 1984 NBA Draft, and selected Michael Jordan out of North Carolina. Jordan won the NBA Rookie of the Year Award in 1985 and led the Bulls to a  record and the seventh seed in the Eastern Conference. As for Cleveland, they had a  record, just a single seed under Chicago with the eighth seed. The Cavaliers wouldn't play the Bulls in the playoffs until 1988, which the Bulls would win, 3–2.

The Shot

Back when the first round was best-of-5 instead of best-of-7, it was game 5 of the First Round in 1989, on May 7, Jordan hit what is known today as "The Shot" even with Cleveland sweeping Chicago in the season, it wasn't enough to get by Jordan's shot to win and play the Knicks the next round. Craig Ehlo was the player Jordan shot over to win the game. The Cavaliers wouldn't play the Bulls in the playoffs until 1992, which Chicago would win yet again 4–2. The Shot is remembered by Cleveland fans as part of the Cleveland sports curse, along with The Drive, The Fumble and Red Right 88. The Bulls would win six NBA championships with Jordan and his partner Scottie Pippen,  and 3 of those championships with Dennis Rodman.

The LeBron James era
The Cleveland Cavaliers were dominated by the Bulls in the rivalry, even with likes of Mark Price, Steve Kerr, Ron Harper and others playing the franchise, Jordan was too much to handle and adding Scottie Pippen made it even more difficult on the Cavaliers, but Jordan would eventually retire and Pippen was traded to the Houston Rockets. Cleveland would have the first pick in the 2003 NBA Draft and used that selection to pick LeBron James. The Cavaliers would take over the rivalry with LeBron, Chicago would pick a hometown player with the first pick as well in Derrick Rose. However, Rose had an injury in the playoffs against Philadelphia that would destroy Rose's promising career that won him the MVP in 2011. Both teams met up in the first round in 2010, and Cleveland won their first ever series against Chicago, 4–1. They would play again in 2015 which Cleveland won again, 4–2.

Bulls' resurgence

In the summer of 2010, Cavaliers superstar LeBron James became a free agent, and announced on ESPN that he would join the Miami Heat, to join Chris Bosh and Dwyane Wade. Meanwhile, the Bulls finished  and earned the first seed in the Eastern Conference playoffs; Derrick Rose would win the NBA MVP. However, the Bulls lost in the Eastern Conference finals against the Miami Heat, who would lose in the NBA Finals against the Dallas Mavericks. Cleveland would draft Duke point guard Kyrie Irving with the first pick and Texas center Tristan Thompson with the fourth pick in the 2011 NBA Draft. Irving would win the Rookie of the Year Award. However, the Cavaliers' best season without James was when they finished  in 2013-14.

Return of LeBron James, 2015 semifinals rematch 
On July 11, 2014, James announced his return to Cleveland in a letter published to Sports Illustrated. The Cavaliers would select Andrew Wiggins in 2014 first overall, who they would trade along with Anthony Bennett to the Minnesota Timberwolves in exchange for Kevin Love. Both the Bulls and Cavaliers would qualify to play in the playoffs.

The Cavaliers earned the Eastern Conference's second seed, and the Bulls earned the third seed. The teams would play each other in the Eastern Conference semi-finals. Chicago won game 1 with Derrick Rose scoring 25 points. Cleveland won game 2 with James scoring 33 points. Chicago won game 3, as Derrick Rose made a shot as time expired. Cleveland won game 4, as James also made a shot as time expired. The Cavaliers would also win games 5 and 6 to eliminate the Bulls, and advanced to play in the 2015 NBA Finals, where they would lose to the Golden State Warriors in 6 games. The Cavaliers played Golden State in the NBA Finals again the next year and came back from a 3–1 series deficit to end the 52-year championship drought in Cleveland.

LeBron leaves again, both teams start rebuilds 

During the 2017 NBA Draft the Bulls traded all-star Jimmy Butler to the Minnesota Timberwolves in exchange for the 7th overall pick (used to pick Lauri Markkanen), Zach LaVine and Kris Dunn to start a rebuild for the Bulls. Meanwhile for Cleveland they traded superstar Kyrie Irving (upon request) to the Boston Celtics in exchange for Isaiah Thomas, Jae Crowder, Ante Žižić and the Brooklyn Nets first round draft pick, later used for Alabama star Collin Sexton. Towards the beginning of the season there was rumors of LeBron possibly leaving Cleveland again in free agency. The Cavaliers finished with a record of 50–32 and earned the 4th seed. Meanwhile for Chicago they finished with 27–55. The Cavaliers beat the fifth seeded Pacers, first seeded Raptors, and second seeded Celtics to make their fourth straight finals appearance. However they would fall to Golden State lead by Kevin Durant and Stephen Curry again, this time getting swept. The 2018 NBA draft came with possible big NBA stars, and Chicago took Wendell Carter Jr. with their 7th pick, and Cleveland took Collin Sexton straight afterwards with the 8th pick. The LeBron rumors for Cleveland would turn out to be true, as he signed a 4-year $154 million deal with the Lakers. Both Cleveland and Chicago entered the rebuilding stages.

On January 3, 2023, the Cavaliers' Donovan Mitchell scored 71 points against the Bulls for the highest scoring performance since Kobe Bryant's 81-point game. However, Mitchell was found to have committed an uncalled foul in the last play of regulation

Results 
Note: All game scores are listed with the visiting score first

Summary

Players

The following players have played for both the Bulls and Cavaliers:
 Kay Felder
 Carlos Boozer
 Derrick Rose
 Dwyane Wade
 Shannon Brown
 Kyle Korver
 Mike Dunleavy Jr.
 Luol Deng
 Drew Gooden
 Steve Kerr
 Ben Wallace
 Nate Thurmond
 Donyell Marshall
 David Nwaba
 Lou Amundson
 Larry Hughes
 McCoy McLemore
 Ron Harper
 James Edwards

References

National Basketball Association rivalries
Chicago Bulls
Cleveland Cavaliers
Sports in the Midwestern United States